Clinton James "Snuffy" Smith (December 12, 1913 – May 19, 2009) was a Canadian professional ice hockey centre and head coach best known for his time spent in the National Hockey League (NHL) as a player with the New York Rangers and the Chicago Black Hawks.  Following Smith's 10-year NHL career, he served as both a head coach and player in the United States Hockey League (USHL) and American Hockey League (AHL).

Playing career

Minor leagues (1932–1937)
Prior to beginning his NHL career with the New York Rangers in 1936–37, Smith played in several minor professional leagues.  After splitting his first professional season in 1932–33 with the Springfield Indians of the Canadian-American Hockey League (CAHL) and Saskatoon Crescents of the West Coast Hockey League (WCHL),  Smith moved further west to play for the Vancouver Lions of the North West Hockey League (NWHL), where he led the league in scoring with 25 goals in his rookie year.  He then went on to lead the league in points the next two seasons with 44- and 53-point campaigns.

In 1936–37, Smith joined the International-American Hockey League (I-AHL), precursor to the American Hockey League (AHL), and finished second in league scoring to Jack Markle with 54 points as a member of the Philadelphia Ramblers.  He helped lead his team to the Finals of the inaugural Calder Cup championship, but lost to the Syracuse Stars in four games of what was a five-game series.

New York Rangers (1937–1943)
Going the length of the campaign with just one minor penalty, he was also awarded the Lady Byng Trophy, his first of two in his career. The following season, he helped lead the Rangers to the Stanley Cup championship, defeating the Toronto Maple Leafs in six games (the win was the Rangers' last before their 54-year Cup drought, ending in 1994).

Despite winning the Stanley Cup that year, however, Smith's production began to tail off with the Rangers, scoring only 24 points that championship year.

Chicago Black Hawks (1943–1947)
Joining the Chicago Black Hawks in 1943–44, Smith rejuvenated his career playing on a line with future fellow Hockey Hall of Famers, Bill Mosienko and Doug Bentley.  He recorded 23 goals and established an NHL record for single-season assists with 49 (broken the following season by Elmer Lach of the Montreal Canadiens) for an NHL career-high 72 points.  The combined total of Mosienko, Bentley and Smith's points that season also set an NHL record for a line with 219.  Smith's record-setting season was complemented by a second Lady Byng Trophy, having only accumulated 4 penalty minutes.

The following season, in 1944–45, Smith succeeded Bentley Smith set another NHL record with a four-goal period against the Montreal Canadiens on March 4, 1945 (Smith shares the record with several other players).  The remainder of Smith's four-season stay in Chicago was not met with as much offensive success as his initial campaign with the team, but he did, however, record three straight 20-goal seasons, including a personal best 26-goal season in 1945–46.  After his production dipped to 26 points in 1946–47, he retired from the NHL.

Coaching in the minors (1947–1952)
Smith returned to the minor leagues in 1947–48, joining the short-lived United States Hockey League (USHL) with the Tulsa Oilers.  He led Tulsa in scoring with 71 points in his only season while also serving as the team's head coach.  Finishing in the top ten in league scoring, he won the Herman W. Paterson Cup as league MVP.

The following season, he also did double duty playing and coaching in St. Paul Saints, where he played for three seasons.  In 1951–52, Smith joined the Cincinnati Mohawks of the AHL, coaching them to the second round of the Calder Cup playoffs and playing in a limited role, appearing in just 2 games.  Smith retired following his one-season stint with the Mohawks both as a coach and player.

Retirement
Following Smith's retirement, he returned to Vancouver, where he had competed in the NWHL to play oldtimers hockey. He made his residence there and became a founding member of the British Columbia Hockey Benevolent Association, also known as the Canucks Alumni, and at one point held the position of president.

Thirty-nine years following his professional retirement, Smith was inducted into the Hockey Hall of Fame in 1991.

At the time of his death on June 15, 2008, Ray Getliffe, a left winger who played for the Boston Bruins and Montreal Canadiens was said to be the oldest living person to have played in the NHL. Later, it was reported that Smith was the oldest living person to have ever played in the NHL. Both these reports, however, overlooked players who had only played a limited number of games, such as Louis Holmes and Al Suomi. Getliffe, who died at the age of 94, was just several months younger than Smith at the time of his death, while Holmes and Suomi were 97 and 95, respectively at that time. On May 19, 2009, Smith died at the age of 95, leaving Suomi as the oldest living NHL player, at the current age of 99.

He was the last surviving member of Rangers 1940 Stanley Cup team.

In the 2009 book 100 Ranger Greats, the authors ranked Smith at No. 35 all-time of the 901 New York Rangers who had played during the team's first 82 seasons.

Awards
Won the Lady Byng Trophy in 1939 and 1944.
Won a Stanley Cup with the New York Rangers in 1940.
Won the Herman W. Paterson Cup as USHL MVP in 1948.

Career statistics 

* Stanley Cup Champion.

Coaching statistics

See also
 Captain (ice hockey)

References

External links
 
 "Hall of Famer Clint Smith dies at age 95," New York Rangers, Thursday, May 21, 2009.
 Goldstein, Richard. "Clint Smith, Who Won Title With Rangers, Dies at 95," The New York Times, Friday, May 22, 2009.

1913 births
2009 deaths
Canadian ice hockey centres
Chicago Blackhawks captains
Chicago Blackhawks players
Hockey Hall of Fame inductees
Ice hockey people from Saskatchewan
Lady Byng Memorial Trophy winners
New York Rangers players
Springfield Indians players
Stanley Cup champions
Canadian expatriate ice hockey players in the United States